Tiféret Israel Synagogue is a Jewish synagogue located in El Recreo, close to Plaza Venezuela in Caracas, capital of Venezuela. It is also the headquarters of the Israelite Association of Venezuela.

History 

In 1954, the Sephardic Jewish community of Caracas reached an agreement to buy private land in Maripérez, Caracas, in order to build a synagogue to replace the one located in the El Conde area, which had to be demolished as part of the construction of the Bolivar avenue, the main highway during that time. Finally in 1956 the first stone was laid; the synagogue was formally inaugurated and opened to the public in 1963, and since then has served as a religious temple for the Jewish community of Caracas.

In late January 2009, the synagogue was desecrated and vandalized by a criminal gang. The attack followed escalating tensions between the Israeli and Venezuelan governments after the Gaza–Israel conflict of 2008–2009. Three former policemen and three civilians were found guilty and sentenced to ten years in jail.

See also 

 Tiféret Israel Synagogue attack

References 

Buildings and structures in Caracas
Tourist attractions in Caracas
Sephardi synagogues
Synagogues in Venezuela
Sephardi Jewish culture in Venezuela
Synagogues completed in 1963
21st-century attacks on synagogues and Jewish communal organizations